How to Steal a Dog (lit. "The Perfect Way to Steal a Dog") is a 2014 South Korean film directed by Kim Sung-ho, based on the novel of the same name by Barbara O'Connor.

Plot
Ten-year-old Ji-so lives in a van with her mother Jeong-hyeon and younger brother Ji-seok. Her father disappeared after their pizza business went bankrupt. When she sees a missing dog poster with a five-hundred-dollar reward, Ji-so naively believes that that amount of money would be enough to buy her family a house. So she hatches a plan with her friend Chae-rang to find a dog with a rich owner, steal it, then return the dog by pretending to have found it and get the reward. Their target is Wolly, the dog of an old rich lady who owns the restaurant where Ji-so's mom works. While undertaking their "perfect" plan, they befriend Dae-po, a homeless man who ends up living in the abandoned building where they've stashed the dog. But someone else is after Wolly: Soo-young, the old lady's nephew, who'll stop at nothing to gain his aunt's inheritance. In the end, Ji-so and her family do not appear to get a house but the mother takes her son's idea and starts a business from the van and Ji-so learns to be happy with what she has. It seems Soo-young may become homeless after his aunt discovers his duplicity but they later reconcile.

Cast
Lee Re as Ji-so
Lee Ji-won as Chae-rang
Kim Hye-ja as Old lady
Choi Min-soo as Dae-po
Kang Hye-jung as Jeong-hyeon
Lee Chun-hee as Soo-young
Lee Hong-gi as Seok-gu
Lee Ki-young as Director Park
Jo Eun-ji as Chae-rang's mother
Tablo
Kim Won-hyo as Traffic policeman
Kim Jae-hwa as Homeroom teacher
Hong Eun-taek as Ji-seok
Kim Do-yeop as Min-seob
Sam Hammington

Awards and nominations

References

External links
 

2014 films
South Korean crime comedy films
Films based on American novels
2010s crime comedy films
2010s South Korean films
2010s Korean-language films